Cadurciella is a genus of flies in the family Tachinidae.

Species
Cadurciella rufipalpis Villeneuve, 1927
Cadurciella tritaeniata (Rondani, 1859)
Cadurciella uniseta (Curran, 1933)

References

Diptera of Asia
Diptera of Africa
Diptera of Europe
Tachinidae genera
Exoristinae
Taxa named by Joseph Villeneuve de Janti